The 2000 Speedway Grand Prix of Great Britain was the fourth race of the 2000 Speedway Grand Prix season. It took place on 29 July in the Brandon Stadium in Coventry, England

Starting positions draw 

The Speedway Grand Prix Commission nominated British rider Martin Dugard and Lee Richardson as Wild Card. Injured Poles Rafał Dobrucki and Tomasz Gollob was replaced by John Jørgensen and Jason Lyons.
Draw 6.  (2) Tomasz Gollob →  (28) Jason Lyons
Draw 19.  (22) Rafał Dobrucki →  (25) John Jørgensen

Heat details

Standings

See also 
 Speedway Grand Prix
 List of Speedway Grand Prix riders

References

External links 
 FIM-live.com
 SpeedwayWorld.tv

G
Speedway Grand Prix
2000
Speedway Grand Prix of Great Britain
Speedway Grand Prix of Great Britain